Lajoie may refer to:

People
 Andrée Lajoie (born 1933), Canadian jurist and academic
 Bill Lajoie (1934–2010), American baseball player and general manager
 Claude Lajoie (born 1928), Canadian Liberal Party member
 Corey LaJoie (born 1991), American race car driver, son of Randy LaJoie
 Jon Lajoie (born 1980), Canadian comedian, actor, and internet celebrity
 Marjorie Lajoie (born 2000), Canadian ice dancer
 Maxime Lajoie (born 1997), Canadian professional ice hockey player
 Mike Lajoie, American politician from Maine
 Nap Lajoie (1874–1959), American baseball player
 Randy LaJoie (born 1961), American race car driver, father of Corey LaJoie

Places
 Lajoie Dam, a storage dam in British Columbia, Canada
 Lajoie Lake, usually known as Little Gun Lake, a small lake in British Columbia, Canada

See also
 Alexandre Bareil, dit Lajoie (1822–1862), Canadian farmer and political figure
 Frédéric Lajoie-Gravelle (born 1993), Canadian soccer player
 Gérin-Lajoie, a list of people with the surname
 Gérin-Lajoie family

French-language surnames